Lee Henry, also known as Lukas Setto, is a singer, songwriter and record producer from Harrow, London. Henry has been featured on the former MTV BASE number one video "Y Did You Leave?", which was released under his production pseudonym “Tru Menace".

Career 
As his father worked as a DJ, Henry was brought up around music. Interested in his father's record collection, Henry was inspired by artists such as Michael Jackson, Marvin Gaye and Stevie Wonder. In 2004, Henry won the Urban Music Award (UMA) for Best Unsigned Act, chosen from over 3000 entrants.

Following his success at the UMA, Henry signed a contract with the management company 2-Tone Entertainment. Followed his award, Henry has been critically acclaimed for performances on stage with soul singers Omar and Floetry in venues such as the Jazz Cafe and Cargo. He also went on to support U.S. R&B stars Ne-Yo and Timbaland in concert.

As well as writing and performing his own music, Henry has also produced and written for other artists including Omar, Taio Cruz, Kele Le Roc and Terri Walker.

Henry was due to release his debut album Life and Love in 2007.

Henry also releases works under the moniker Lukas Setto.  In 2022, Setto released the singles "My Destiny" and "Get with You Tonight" (with DJ Mark Knight) which received positive reviews.

Discography 
Releases as Lukas Setto

Releases under name Lee Henry

Remixes under name of Tru Menace

Promo - unreleased

Videography

References

External links
 Lee Henry official website
 Lukas Setto official website
 
 
 

Year of birth missing (living people)
Living people
English male singers
British contemporary R&B singers
English record producers
English songwriters
English soul musicians
People from Harrow, London
Singers from London